Achnanthidium is a genus of diatoms belonging to the family Achnanthidiaceae.

The genus was described in 1844 by Friedrich Traugott Kützing.

The genus has cosmopolitan distribution.

Species: (see a more complete list)
 Achnanthidium affine (Grunow) Czarnecki, 1994
 Achnanthidium agardhii (Kützing) Mereschkowsky
 Achnanthidium alpestre (R. Lowe & J.P. Kociolek) R. Lowe & J.P. Kociolek
 Achnanthidium minutissimum (Kützing) Czarnecki

References

Achnanthales
Diatom genera